East Orange is a city in Essex County, in the U.S. state of New Jersey. As of the 2020 United States census, the city's population was 69,612, an increase of 5,342 (+8.3%) from the 2010 census count of 64,270, which in turn reflected a decline of 5,554 (−8.0%) from the 69,824 counted in the 2000 census. The city was the state's 17th most populous municipality in 2020, after having been ranked 20th in 2010 and 14th statewide in 2000. The Census Bureau's Population Estimates Program calculated that the city's population was 68,903 in 2021, ranking the city the 547th-most-populous in the country.

History
East Orange had its origins in Connecticut's New Haven Colony. In 1666, a group of 30 of New Haven's families traveled by water to found "a town on the Passayak" River. They arrived on territory now encompassing Newark, the Oranges, and several other municipalities. The area was situated in the northeast portion of a land grant conveyed by King Charles II of England to his brother James, Duke of York. In 1664, James conveyed the land to two proprietors, Lord John Berkeley and Sir George Carteret. Since Carteret had been Royal Governor of the Isle of Jersey, the territory became known as New Jersey.

East Orange was initially a part of Newark and was originally known as Newark Mountains. On June 7, 1780, the townspeople of Newark Mountains officially voted to adopt the name Orange. At the time, there was a significant number of people in favor of secession from Newark. However, this would not occur until November 27, 1806, when the territory now encompassing all of the Oranges was finally detached. On April 13, 1807, the first government was elected, but not until March 13, 1860 was Orange officially incorporated as a city. Immediately, the new city began fragmenting into smaller communities, primarily because of local disputes about the costs of establishing paid police, fire, and street departments. South Orange was organized on January 26, 1861; Fairmount (later to become part of West Orange) on March 11, 1862; East Orange on March 4, 1863; and West Orange (including Fairmount) on March 14, 1863. East Orange was reincorporated as a city on December 9, 1899, based on the results of a referendum held two days earlier.

East Orange was known, at one time, for the shade trees that lined the city's residential streets. This is still evident today as many of the tall trees still stand.

Geography
According to the U.S. Census Bureau, the city had a total area of 3.93 square miles (10.17 km2), all of which was land.

East Orange shares borders with the Essex County municipalities of Newark to the east and south, South Orange to the southwest, Orange to the west, and Glen Ridge and Bloomfield to the north.

Unincorporated communities, localities and place names located partially or completely within the city include Ampere and Brick Church.

Neighborhoods

East Orange is officially divided into five wards, but is also unofficially divided into a number of neighborhoods, still with many well maintained streets and homes.
 Ampere: Anchored by the now defunct train station of the same name, The Ampere section was developed on land owned by Orange Water Works, after the construction of the Crocker Wheeler Company plant spurred development in the area. The station was named in honor of André-Marie Ampère, a pioneer in electrodynamics and reconstructed as a new Renaissance Revival station in 1907 and 1908. Roughly bounded by Bloomfield to the North, Lawton Street & Newark to the east, 4th Avenue to the south, and North Grove Street to the West.
 Greenwood (Teen Streets): So named after Greenwood Avenue and the "teen" streets that run through it. It is often grouped together with Ampere. This area was severely disturbed by the construction of Interstate 280 and the Garden State Parkway. The Grove Street Station of the former DL & W Railroad was located here at Grove and Main Streets. Roughly bounded by 4th Avenue to the North, North 15th Street/Newark to the East, Eaton Place/NJ Transit Morris & Essex Lines, and North Grove Street to the West.
 Presidential Estates: Recently designated due to the streets in this area being named after early presidents of the United States. There are many large well kept homes situated on streets lined with very old, very large shade trees in this neighborhood that are characteristic of the northern section of the city. Roughly Bounded by Bloomfield to the North, Montclair-Boonton Line and North Grove Street to the East, Springdale Avenue to the South and the Garden State Parkway to the West.
 Elmwood: Located in the southeastern part of the city. Elmwood Park serves this section of the city, with 7 tennis courts on Rhode Island Avenue, a basketball court on the corner of Elmwood Avenue and Oak Street, a swimming pool with a pool house, a walking track, a baseball field, a softball field and a renovated field house. The area holds one of the surviving Carnegie Libraries, the Elmwood Branch of the East Orange Public Library, opened in 1912.
 Doddtown (Franklin): Named after John Dodd who founded and surveyed the area of the "Watsessing Plain". The former campus of Upsala College is located here. It was converted into the new East Orange Campus High School on the east side of Prospect Street, and an adjacent new housing subdivision. Roughly bounded by Bloomfield to the North, the Garden State Parkway to the East, Park Avenue to the South and Orange to the West.

Demographics

2020 census

2010 census

The Census Bureau's 2006–2010 American Community Survey showed that (in 2010 inflation-adjusted dollars) median household income was $40,358 (with a margin of error of +/− $1,873) and the median family income was $50,995 (+/− $2,877). Males had a median income of $38,642 (+/− $1,851) versus $39,843 (+/− $2,187) for females. The per capita income for the city was $20,298 (+/− $746). About 17.8% of families and 21.4% of the population were below the poverty line, including 32.5% of those under age 18 and 16.4% of those age 65 or over.

2000 census
As of the 2000 United States census there were 69,824 people, 26,024 households, and 16,082 families residing in the city. The population density was 17,776.6 people per square mile (6,859.8/km2). There were 28,485 housing units at an average density of 7,252.0 per square mile (2,798.5/km2). The racial makeup of the city was 89.46% Black or African American, 3.84% White, 0.25% Native American, 0.43% Asian, 0.07% Pacific Islander, 2.14% from other races, and 3.80% from two or more races. Hispanic or Latino of any race were 4.70% of the population.

There were 26,024 households, out of which 31.9% had children under the age of 18 living with them, 26.0% were married couples living together, 28.8% had a female householder with no husband present, and 38.2% were non-families. 33.0% of all households were made up of individuals, and 11.0% had someone living alone who was 65 years of age or older. The average household size was 2.63 and the average family size was 3.37.

In the city the population was spread out, with 28.1% under the age of 18, 9.8% from 18 to 24, 30.1% from 25 to 44, 20.8% from 45 to 64, and 11.2% who were 65 years of age or older. The median age was 33 years. For every 100 females, there were 81.9 males. For every 100 females age 18 and over, there were 74.7 males.

The median income for a household in the city was $32,346, and the median income for a family was $38,562. Males had a median income of $31,905 versus $30,268 for females. The per capita income for the city was $16,488. About 15.9% of families and 19.2% of the population were below the poverty line, including 24.7% of those under age 18 and 14.0% of those ages 65 or over.

As part of the 2000 Census, 89.46% of East Orange's residents identified themselves as being Black or African American. This was one of the highest percentages of African American and Caribbean American people in the United States. Migrants from Jamaica, Trinidad and Tobago, Guyana, Haiti and other smaller Caribbean Islands have a huge presence, and East Orange has the second-highest in New Jersey (behind Lawnside, at 93.6%) of all places with 1,000 or more residents identifying Black American ancestry. East Orange also has a large Haitian American community, with 2,852 persons claiming Haitian ancestry in the 2000 Census.

Although still a small percentage of total residents, Orange and East Orange have the largest concentrations of Guyanese Americans in the country. In the 2000 Census, 2.5% of East Orange residents identified as being of Guyanese ancestry. While Queens and Brooklyn had larger populations in terms of raw numbers, Orange (with 2.9%) and East Orange had the highest percentage of people of Guyanese ancestry of all places in the United States with at least 1,000 people identifying their ancestry.

Economy

Portions of the city are part of an Urban Enterprise Zone (UEZ), one of 32 zones covering 37 municipalities statewide. East Orange was selected in 1996 as one of a group of seven zones added to participate in the program. In addition to other benefits to encourage employment and investment within the UEZ, shoppers can take advantage of a reduced 3.3125% sales tax rate (half of the % rate charged statewide) at eligible merchants. Established in June 1996, the city's Urban Enterprise Zone status expires in June 2027.

The main commercial avenues of the city are Central Avenue and Main Street, both of which flow east to west, the latter of which was disturbed by the construction of Interstate 280. Recent efforts have been made to revitalize the commercial area, especially along Main Street and Evergreen Place. New apartments buildings & commercial space have been proposed and built over the last decade. Along South Harrison Street, new apartment buildings have gone up, while existing ones have been updated.

Parks and recreation

East Orange is served by five parks. Paul Robeson Stadium, located on North Clinton Street, hosts local sports teams and typically, the city's annual 4th of July fireworks celebration.

Government

East Orange is governed under the City form of New Jersey municipal government. The city is one of 15 municipalities (of the 564) statewide that use this traditional form of government. The government is comprised of a mayor and a city council made up of ten members, two representing each of the city's five geographic political subdivisions called wards. The mayor is elected directly by the voters. The ten members of the city council are elected to four-year terms on a staggered basis, with one seat in each ward coming up for election in odd-numbered years.

The City Council performs the legislative functions of municipal government by enacting ordinances, resolutions or motions, and is responsible for review and adoption of the municipal budget that has been submitted by the mayor.

, the Mayor of East Orange, New Jersey is Democrat Theodore R. "Ted" Green, whose term of office ends December 31, 2025. Members of the City Council are Christopher Awe (D, 2025; 2nd Ward), Mustafa Al-M. Brent (D, 2023; 5th Ward), Brittany D. Claybrooks (D, 2023; 2nd Ward), Tameika Garrett-Ward (D, 2025; 4th Ward), Casim L. Gomez (D, 2023; 4th Ward), Alicia Holman (D, 2025; 5th Ward), Christopher D. James (D, 2025; 1st Ward), Bergson Leneus (D, 2025; 3rd Ward), Amy Lewis (D, 2023; 1st Ward) and Vernon Pullins Jr. (D, 2023; 3rd Ward).

In July 2018, the City Council selected Christopher Awe to fill the Second Ward seat expiring in December 2021 that became vacant when Romal D. Bullock resigned to become the city's tax assessor. In November 2018, Awe was elected to serve the balance of the term of office.

In December 2018, Tameika Garrett-Ward was appointed to fill the Fourth Ward seat expiring in December 2021 that became vacant when Tyshammie L. Cooper was sworn into office on the Essex County Board of chosen freeholders; she was elected to serve the balance of the term in November 2019.

The first African-American Mayor of East Orange was William S. Hart Sr., who was elected to two consecutive terms, serving in office from 1970 to 1978. Hart Middle School was named after him.

Federal, state and county representation

East Orange is located in the 10th Congressional District and is part of New Jersey's 34th state legislative district.

Politics
As of March 2011, there were a total of 36,280 registered voters in East Orange, of which 21,646 (59.7%) were registered as Democrats, 396 (1.1%) were registered as Republicans and 14,228 (39.2%) were registered as Unaffiliated. There were 10 voters registered to other parties.

In the 2012 presidential election, Democrat Barack Obama received 98.5% of the vote (24,862 cast), ahead of Republican Mitt Romney with 1.3% (330 votes), and other candidates with 0.2% (46 votes), among the 25,375 ballots cast by the city's 39,668 registered voters (137 ballots were spoiled), for a turnout of 64.0%. In the 2008 presidential election, Democrat Barack Obama received 97.7% of the vote (24,718 cast), ahead of Republican John McCain with 1.6% (408 votes) and other candidates with 0.1% (35 votes), among the 25,304 ballots cast by the city's 36,891 registered voters, for a turnout of 68.6%. In the 2004 presidential election, Democrat John Kerry received 93.2% of the vote (19,447 ballots cast), outpolling Republican George W. Bush with 5.9% (1,225 votes) and other candidates with 0.4% (128 votes), among the 20,856 ballots cast by the city's 33,328 registered voters, for a turnout percentage of 62.6.

In the 2013 gubernatorial election, Democrat Barbara Buono received 88.0% of the vote (9,413 cast), ahead of Republican Chris Christie with 11.3% (1,212 votes), and other candidates with 0.7% (75 votes), among the 11,269 ballots cast by the city's 41,016 registered voters (569 ballots were spoiled), for a turnout of 27.5%. In the 2009 gubernatorial election, Democrat Jon Corzine received 94.4% of the vote (12,554 ballots cast), ahead of Republican Chris Christie with 2.9% (380 votes), Independent Chris Daggett with 1.2% (153 votes) and other candidates with 0.5% (63 votes), among the 13,295 ballots cast by the city's 36,157 registered voters, yielding a 36.8% turnout.

Education
The East Orange School District serves students in pre-kindergarten through twelfth grade. The district is one of 31 former Abbott districts statewide that were established pursuant to the decision by the New Jersey Supreme Court in Abbott v. Burke which are now referred to as "SDA Districts" based on the requirement for the state to cover all costs for school building and renovation projects in these districts under the supervision of the New Jersey Schools Development Authority.

As of the 2018–19 school year, the district, comprised of 20 schools, had an enrollment of 10,072 students and 744.0 classroom teachers (on an FTE basis), for a student–teacher ratio of 13.5:1. Schools in the district (with 2018–19 enrollment data from the National Center for Education Statistics) are
Althea Gibson Early Childhood Academy (159 students; in grades Pre-K and K), 
Wahlstrom Early Childhood Center (156; Pre-K–K), 
Benjamin Banneker Academy (511; Pre-K–5), 
Edward T. Bowser, Sr. School of Excellence (609; Pre-K–5), 
George Washington Carver Institute of Science and Technology (325; Pre-K–5), 
Johnnie L. Cochran Jr. Academy (193; K–5), 
Mildred Barry Garvin School (356; Pre-K–5), 
Whitney E. Houston Academy of Creative & Performing Arts (369; Pre-K–8), 
Langston Hughes Elementary School (589; Pre-K–5), 
J. Garfield Jackson Sr. Academy (256; K–5), 
Ecole Touissant Louverture (297; Pre-K–5), 
Gordon Parks Academy School of Radio, Animation, Film and Television (285; Pre-K–5), 
Cicely L. Tyson Community Elementary School (504; Pre-K–5), 
Dionne Warwick Institute of Economics and Entrepreneurship (462; Pre-K–5), 
Future Ready Prep (NA; 6–7), 
Patrick F. Healy Middle School (392; 7), 
John L. Costley Middle School (367; 8), Sojourner Truth Middle School (406; 6), 
Cicely Tyson School of Performing and Fine Arts (740; 6–12), 
East Orange Campus High School located on the former campus of Upsala College (1,651; 9–12), 
East Orange STEM Academy (358; 9–12) and 
Fresh Start Academy Middle / High – Glenwood Campus (NA; 6–12).

East Orange Community Charter School is a public charter school that operates independently of the school district under a charter granted by the New Jersey Department of Education.

The East Orange Public Library at one time included three branch buildings of the original 36 Carnegie-funded libraries in New Jersey. It has a collection of 344,000 volumes and circulates about 319,000 items annually from four locations.

Ahlus Sunnah School is a K–12 madrasah that has been in East Orange since 2005.

Healthcare
East Orange is served by East Orange General Hospital, located on Central Avenue in the southern part of the city. The 211 bed hospital is the only independent, fully accredited, acute care hospital in Essex County. The hospital was recently acquired by Prospect Medical Systems.  East Orange is also home to the US Department of Veterans Affairs Medical Center, also known as the East Orange VA Hospital. It is located on Tremont Avenue near S.Orange Ave. and serves many vets from the region.

Transportation

Roads and highways

The Garden State Parkway passes through the city, connecting Newark in the south to Bloomfield in the north. The Parkway is accessible at Interchange 145 for Interstate 280 and at Interchange 147 for Springdale Avenue. Interstate 280 crosses the city from east to west, connecting Orange to the west and Newark to the east.

Public transportation
Local transportation around the city and into neighboring communities is provided by ONE Bus bus routes 24 & 44 and multiple NJ Transit public bus lines, which includes routes 5, 21, 34, 41, 71, 73, 79, 90, 92, 94, and 97.

New Jersey Transit operates two commuter rail train stations in East Orange, both located along the Morris & Essex Lines. The East Orange station is located beside the westbound lanes of Interstate 280, directly across its parking lot from East Orange City Hall. Just one mile west up Main Street is Brick Church station, the city's second rail stop and the more heavily used of the two. Both have seven-day service to New York Penn Station in Midtown Manhattan as well as weekday service to Hoboken Terminal.

The Montclair-Boonton Line runs through the Ampere neighborhood of the city on the east, after splitting off from the Morris & Essex Lines just east of the city line in Newark. Ampere station was a former stop on the line near Ampere Parkway & Springdale Avenue which opened in 1890, but closed in 1991 due to low ridership. Residents can use nearby Watsessing Avenue station in neighboring Bloomfield. Another former stop was Grove Street Station, a mile east of Brick Church, also closed in 1991.

Notable people

People who were born in, residents of, or otherwise closely associated with East Orange include:

 David Ackroyd (born 1940), actor, who first came to prominence in soap operas such as The Secret Storm and Another World
 John Amos (born 1939), actor
 Jamal Anderson (born 1972), former NFL running back
 Billy Ard (born 1959), NFL guard who played for the New York Giants and Green Bay Packers
 Balanda Atis (born 1972/73), cosmetic chemist at L'Oréal, where her work focuses on expanding the company's range of cosmetics marketed to women of color
 Robert H. B. Baldwin (1920–2016), chairman of Morgan Stanley when the bank was taken public in the 1970s
 Norman Batten (1893–1928), race car driver
 James Blish (1921–1975), science fiction writer
 Alvin Bowen (born 1983), gridiron football linebacker who played in the NFL for the Jacksonville Jaguars
 Clyde Bradshaw (born 1959), basketball player who played for the DePaul Blue Demons
 Betty Bronson (1906–1971), television and film actress who began her career during the silent film era
 Herbert Brucker (1898–1977), journalist, teacher, and national advocate for the freedom of the press, who served as editor-in-chief of the Hartford Courant
 Stephanie R. Bush (born 1953), attorney and politician who served in the New Jersey General Assembly representing the 27th district from 1988 to 1992
 Robert L. Carter (1917–2012), civil rights leader and United States District Judge
 Kerri Chandler (born 1969), Deep House DJ and producer
 Bill Chinnock (1947–2007), singer-songwriter and guitarist who was part of the Asbury Park music scene with Bruce Springsteen in late 1960s
 Chino XL (born 1974), hip-hop lyricist
 Margaret Clapp (1910–1974, class of 1926), scholar and educator, who served as eighth president of Wellesley College
 Troy CLE, pseudonym of Troy Tompkins, author of The Marvelous Effect (set in East Orange)
 Bob Clifford (–2006), football player and coach, who served as the head football coach at Colby College and at the University of Vermont.
 Vincent Czyz (born 1963), writer and critic of speculative fiction
 Randall Davey (1887–1964), painter and art educator
 Frances Day (1907–1984), actress and cabaret singer in the United Kingdom during the 1930s, and television celebrity in the United States during the 1950s
 Branson DeCou (1892–1941), photographer and traveler
 Rasul Douglas (born 1995), cornerback for the Philadelphia Eagles of the National Football League
 Dorothy Eaton (1893-1968), visual artist best known for rural subjects in a style that merged nineteenth-century regional folk art with mid-century American realism.
 Philip Egner (1870–1956), longtime director of the West Point Band and composer of the West Point fight song "On, Brave Old Army Team"
 William Joseph Fallon (born 1944), United States Navy Admiral who is the current Commander of United States Central Command
 Gale Fitzgerald (born 1951), athlete who competed in two Olympic pentathlons, winning silver medal in 1975 at the Pan American Games
 Chris Fletcher (born 1948), safety who played for the San Diego Chargers during his seven-year NFL career
 Franklin W. Fort (1880–1937), represented New Jersey's 9th congressional district from 1925 to 1931
 Major Harold Geiger (1884–1927), pioneer in Army aviation and ballooning
 Althea Gibson (1927–2003), tennis player
 David Garrard (born 1978), quarterback who played for the NFL's New York Jets
 Tate George (born 1968), former basketball player who played with the New Jersey Nets for three of his four NBA seasons
 Eugenia Gilbert (1902–1978), actress of the silent film era who starred in many westerns
 Red Grammer (born 1952), children's music writer
Bessie Mecklem Hackenberger (1876–1942), one of the earliest American-born saxophone soloists
 Robert David Hall (born 1947), actor who is best known for his role as coroner Dr. Albert Robbins M.D. on the television show CSI: Crime Scene Investigation
 Mary Jeanne Hallstrom (1924–2006), nurse and member of the Illinois House of Representatives, was born in East Orange
 Eric P. Hamp (1920–2019), Indo-European linguist and professor at the University of Chicago
 Slide Hampton (1932–2021), jazz trombonist
 Vincent S. Haneman (1902–1978), Associate Justice of the New Jersey Supreme Court from 1960 to 1971
 Ann Harding (1902–1981), theatre, motion picture, radio, and television actress
 Balozi Harvey (1940–2016, class of 1957), diplomat and community organizer 
 J.C. Hayward (born ), news anchor formerly at WUSA, who was the first female news anchor in Washington, D.C. and the first African American female news presenter
 Carolyn Gold Heilbrun (1926–2003), author who wrote mystery novels under the pen name of Amanda Cross
 Frances Cox Henderson (1820–1897), wife of Governor James Pinckney Henderson of Texas, who established the Good Shepherd home for aged women after moving to East Orange following her husband's death
 Caroline Herzenberg (born 1932), physicist
 Brian Hill (born 1947), former coach of the Orlando Magic
 Lauryn Hill (born 1975), singer-songwriter, rapper, producer and actress
 Fred Hills, (1934–2020), literary editor, known for his association with writers including Vladimir Nabokov, Raymond Carver and Heinrich Böll
 Robert Hillyer (1895–1961), poet and professor of English literature who won a Pulitzer Prize for poetry in 1934
 Whitney Houston (1963–2012), singer and actress
 Karen Hunter (born 1966), journalist, publisher, talk show host and the co-author of several books
 Janis Ian (born 1951), singer-songwriter
 Monte Irvin (1919–2016), Major League Baseball player inducted as a member of the Baseball Hall of Fame who was ranked #12 on the Sports Illustrated list of The 50 Greatest New Jersey Sports Figures
 Malcolm Jenkins (born 1987), football player for the Philadelphia Eagles
 Jarrod Johnson (born 1969), former professional football player who played for the Pittsburgh Steelers, San Diego Chargers and the Sacramento Surge of the World League of American Football
 David Jones (born 1968), former NFL tight end who played for the Los Angeles Raiders in 1992
 Ernest Lester Jones (1876–1929), head of the United States Coast and Geodetic Survey from 1914 until his death
 LeRoy J. Jones Jr. (born 1957), member of the New Jersey General Assembly
 KayGee (born 1969 as Kier Lamont Gist), DJ and record producer best known as a member of hip hop trio Naughty by Nature
 Brandin Knight (born 1981), former professional basketball player, brother of Brevin Knight
 Brevin Knight (born 1975), former NBA point guard who played for nine teams during his 13-year career, brother of Brandin Knight
 Marietta Patricia Leis (born 1938), multimedia artist and poet
 Elizabeth Losey (1912–2005), conservationist who is recognized as being the first female refuge biologist
 William Lowell Sr. (1863–1954), dentist and an inventor of a wooden golf tee patented in 1921
 Clara Maass (1876–1901), nurse who died as a result of volunteering for medical experiments to study yellow fever
 Gordon MacRae (1921–1986), actor, singer, he was born in East Orange
 John F. Madden (1870–1946), U.S. Army brigadier general
 Elliott Maddox (born 1947), Major League Baseball outfielder who played for both the New York Mets and New York Yankees
 Naomi Long Madgett (1923–2020), poet
 Marion Clyde McCarroll (1891–1977), writer and journalist who was the first woman issued a press pass by the New York Stock Exchange and also penned the "Advice for the Lovelorn, a nationally syndicated column, after she inherited it from Dorothy Dix
 Stephen A. Mikulak (1948–2014, class of 1966), politician who served in the New Jersey General Assembly from 1992 to 1996, where he represented the 19th Legislative District
 Newton Edward Miller (1919–2012), politician who served in the New Jersey General Assembly, where he represented the 34th Legislative District
 Daniel F. Minahan (1877–1947), represented New Jersey's 6th congressional district from 1919 to 1921 and again from 1923 to 1925
 Dorian Missick (born ), actor, known for his role as Damian in the television series Six Degrees and for voicing Victor Vance in the video game Grand Theft Auto: Vice City Stories
 Evelyn Groesbeeck Mitchell (1879 – 1964), entomologist and physician
 Worrall Frederick Mountain (1909–1992), Justice of the New Jersey Supreme Court from 1971 to 1979
 Annie Oakley (1860–1926) and her husband Frank E. Butler (1852–1926) lived at 22 Eppirt Street between 1905 and 1908
 Naughty by Nature members Treach, Vin Rock and DJ Kay Gee
 Naturi Naughton (born 1984), singer and actress who was a member of the early 2000s group, 3LW
 C. Milford Orben (1895–1975), politician who served five terms in the New Jersey General Assembly
 Robert Peace (–2011), the subject of The Short and Tragic Life of Robert Peace
 Elizabeth Peer (1936–1984), journalist
 Jabrill Peppers (born 1995), football player for the New York Giants of the NFL
 Chickie Geraci Poisson (born 1931), former field hockey player and coach
 Stewart G. Pollock (born 1933), Justice of the Supreme Court of New Jersey from 1979 to 1999
 Queen Latifah (born 1970), rapper, singer, model and actress
 Eddie Rabbitt (1941–1998), singer-songwriter
 C. Thomas Schettino (1907–1983), Justice of the New Jersey Supreme Court from 1959 to 1972
 Shareefa (born 1984), R&B singer
 Ben Sirmans (born 1970), American football coach and former running back who is the running backs coach for the Green Bay Packers of the National Football League
 Newton Phelps Stallknecht (1906–1981), philosopher who was a president of the Metaphysical Society of America
 Janet Sorg Stoltzfus, (1931–2004), educator, who established the Ta'iz Cooperative School, the first non-religious school in north Yemen.
 Donald J. Strait (1918–2015), flying ace in the 356th Fighter Group during World War II and a career officer in the United States Air Force
 Richard Thaler (born 1945), economist who was the recipient of the 2017 Nobel Memorial Prize in Economic Sciences
 Tom Verducci (born 1960), sports journalist
 Albert L. Vreeland (1901–1975), United States Representative from New Jersey
 James Wallwork (born 1930), politician who served in both houses of the New Jersey Legislature
 Dionne Warwick (born 1940), singer
 Laurence Hawley Watres (1882–1964), U.S. Congressman from Pennsylvania, lived in East Orange during his retirement
 Valerie Wilson Wesley (born 1947), mystery writer
 Barrence Whitfield (born 1955), soul and R&B vocalist, best known as the frontman for Barrence Whitfield & the Savages
 George Whitman (1913–2011), proprietor of the Paris bookstore Shakespeare and Company
 William H. Wiley (1842–1925), served on East Orange township committee from 1886 to 1888, president for one year; represented New Jersey's 8th congressional district from 1903 to 1907 and 1909 to 1911, co-founder of publishing company John Wiley & Sons
 Bruce Williams (1932–2019), radio host
 Jocelyn Willoughby (born 1998), basketball player for the New York Liberty of the WNBA
 Marion Thompson Wright (1902–1962), scholar and activist who, in 1940, became the first African-American woman in the United States to earn her Ph.D. in history

References

Further reading
 Hart, William. East Orange. Charleston, SC: Arcadia Publishing, 2006.
 Stuart, Mark A. A Centennial History of East Orange. East Orange, NJ: East Orange Centennial Committee, 1964.

External links

 East Orange website

 
1863 establishments in New Jersey
Cities in Essex County, New Jersey
City form of New Jersey government
New Jersey Urban Enterprise Zones
Populated places established in 1863
The Oranges, New Jersey